The 2002 Proximus 24 Spa was the 56th running of the Spa 24 Hours and the seventh round the 2002 FIA GT Championship.  This event combined the FIA GT's two classes (GT and N-GT) with cars from smaller national series designated GTN and single-make series designated SMM.  An additional class was added for cars confirming to N-GT but with engines under 2000 cc.  It took place at the Circuit de Spa-Francorchamps, Belgium, on 3 and 4 August 2002.

Official results
Class winners in bold.  Cars failing to complete 70% of winner's distance marked as Not Classified (NC).

Statistics
 Pole position – #23 BMS Scuderia Italia – 2:16.393
 Fastest lap – #23 BMS Scuderia Italia – 2:18.745
 Distance – 3665.168 km
 Average speed – 152.478 km/h

References

 
 
 

S
Spa 24 Hours
Spa 24 Hours